Richard Wildeman is a computer animator, part of the award-winning Science North Production Team. Science North is a science centre producing multi-media exhibits, displays and IMAX films. His most recent film is about bird migration education produced for the Philadelphia Zoo.

Selected works and multimedia experiences 

Aztec Theatre - Aztec On The River - TEA's Thea Award Winner
Concorde Experience - Barbados Concorde Museum - Concorde aircraft histories (2006)
Waterworks - (2008)
Ground Rules  - Caterpillar Inc. (2008)
Sudbury Neutrino Observatory - Object Theatre Update (2008)
Xstrata: Rags To Riches - (2008)
Migration Story - Philadelphia Zoo(2009)
Creatures of the Abyss - International Multi-Media Exhibit (2009)

Critical appraise 
The production team were among the winners of the 14th annual international TEA Themed Entertainment Association Thea awards.

References 

http://www.philadelphiazoo.org/
http://www.aztecontheriver.com/
http://www.thesudburystar.com/media/pages/getaway09/pdf/20090612-C20.pdf
Climate Change 8. SNO 9. 2008 Michael Smith Award for Science Promotion by the Natural Sciences and Engineering Research Council of Canada http://www.timminspress.com/ArticleDisplay.aspx?e=1585691 10. Ground Rules Article in CSC Magazine https://web.archive.org/web/20110706174553/http://www.csc.ca/news/default.asp?aID=1354

Canadian animators
Living people
Year of birth missing (living people)